"Don't Send Me Roses (Dear Abby)" was a hit single for Irish born Toronto-based singer Yvonne Murray. Produced by Paul Zaza the single brought Murray national recognition, registering in two charts.

Background
The single for "Don't Send Me Roses (Dear Abby)" was backed with "One Day at a Time" and released on MCG JM8368. Both sides were composed by J. Ian McClean with Paul Zaza handling both arrangement and production.
With her self-titled debut album being reviewed in the September 24, 1983 issue of RPM Weekly, "Don't Send Me Roses (Dear Abby)" had entered the RPM Contemporary Adult chart at #29.  Murray's management company, the Meloche Communications Group had launched an aggressive campaign to promote the album to tie it in with the release of the single which was taken from the album.

Charts
For the week ending October 8, the single entered the RPM Country 50 Singles chart at number 50 and was at number 24 on the RPM Contemporary Adult chart. The song peaked at number 13 on the tenth week in the RPM Contemporary Adult chart on November 26. It also peaked on that date at number 22 in its eighth week in the RPM Country Singles chart.

References

1983 singles